Angela Hayes may refer to:

Angela Hayes (mixed martial artist) on Tapout
Angela Hayes, character in the 1999 film American Beauty, portrayed by Mena Suvari

See also
Angela Haynes (born 1984), American former tennis player